Ethiopians are the native inhabitants of Ethiopia, as well as the global diaspora of Ethiopia. Ethiopians constitute several component ethnic groups, many of which are closely related to ethnic groups in neighboring Eritrea and other parts of the Horn of Africa.

The first documented use of the name "Ethiopia" from Greek name 
"Αἰθίοψ" (Ethiopian) was in the 4th century during the reign of Aksumite king Ezana. There were three ethnolinguistic groups in the Kingdom of Aksum; Semitic, Cushitic, and Nilo-Saharan (ancestors of the modern-day Kunama and Nara). The Kingdom of Aksum remained a geopolitically influential entity until the pillage of its capital — also named Axum — in the 10th century by Queen Gudit. Nevertheless, the core Aksumite civilization was preserved and continued into the successive Zagwe dynasty. By this time, new ethnic groups emerged – the Tigrayans and Amharas. During the Solomonic period, the latter established major political and cultural influence Horn of Africa.
In the Late Middle Ages, Muslim states were established, including the Sultanate of Ifat, and its successor the Adal Sultanate. Discontent with territory and religious dominance led to intense war between the Ethiopian Empire, the Christian state, (consisting of the Amhara, Tigrayan, Soddo Gurage, and Agaw ethnic groups) and the Muslim state Adal Sultanate (consisting of Semitic speaking Harari formally known as the Harla people and the Argobba). During the 1600s, there were large-scale migrations of the Oromo from the south into the highlands and also alongside the Somali into Adal or what was known as "Hararghe" (land of the Hararis).

A period of stability and peace continued through the Gondarine period in 16th and 17th century, but Ethiopia was divided into de facto autonomous regions in the mid-18th century. During this time, Ethiopia was nominally ruled by an Emperor who functioned as a puppet monarch of various regional lords and noblemen. This era was known as the Zemene Mesafint or "Era of the Princes". Emperor Tewodros II managed to unify the decentralized Ethiopian Empire in 1855 and inaugurated a process of modernization that continued into successive regimes, resurrecting the empire as a regional power.

In the late 19th-century during the reign of Menelik II, against the backdrop of the Scramble for Africa, the notion of Ethiopian national integrity was strengthened by Italian efforts at colonization. The Italian invasion engendered a formidable national resistance, culminating in the Battle of Adwa in 1896 which resulted in a major Ethiopian victory against the Italians. The resulting Treaty of Addis Ababa ended the Italo-Ethiopian War, and along with the nation's contemporaneous territorial expansion, largely established the modern-day boundaries of Ethiopia.

Present-day Ethiopia has a diverse population with many different languages and ethnic groups. Ethiopians speak Afro-Asiatic languages (Semitic, Cushitic, and Omotic) and Nilo-Saharan languages. The Oromo, Amhara, Somali and Tigrayans make up more than three-quarters (75%) of the population, but there are more than 80 different ethnic groups within Ethiopia. Some of these have as few as 10,000 members.

History

Prehistory
Archaeologist found remains of early hominins, one of the most specimen was Australopithecus afarensis, also called "Lucy", which was discovered in the country's Awash Valley, so-called Hadar in 1974. It is estimated to be 3.5 million years old. In October 2015, scientists found a 4,500 years ago lived man called Mota in a cave in southern central Ethiopia. Atypical to Euroasians, which were believed reached the region after him, Mota's genetic variants was not as "light-colored eye or skin", resembles the modern Aari tribes that live in the southern area of the country. Another research suggests that Euroasians arrived in the region resembles modern-day Sardinians, or likely LBK culture of antiquity. By proofing Mota has no European genome, archeologist theorized the Near East population migrated to Africa in 3,000 years ago. Other evidence concluded that Eurasian population made significant contribution as a result of back migration between 1,500 and 3,500 years ago. Nilo-Saharan peoples do not exhibit this genetic similarity; instead, their DNA shows evidence of more recent admixture (less than 1200 years ago) with other African peoples. It was thought that Hamitic people from Asia Minor had migrated before Semitic Arabian people in the 7th century BC. In 1933, G.W.B Huntingford proposed a theory of Azanian civilization could existed in Kenya, and northern Tanzania, between the Stone Age and Islamic period. It was supposed that these people evicted from Ethiopia and Somalia by Muslim invasion to southern region in present-day Kenya and Tanzania where perished around 14th- and 15th-century.

About 7000 BC, Afro-Asiatic-speaking population namely Cushitic and Omotic-speaking people grouped in the present day of Ethiopia after which diversification thrived in the area and allowed the other local groups, the Agaws, Somali, Oromo, and numerous Omotic-speaking groups to unify. Originally a hunter gatherers, those people began domesticating indigenous plants thereafter, including the grasses teff, eleusine, enset, root crop, and domestication of cattles and other animals to fill agricultural livelihoods that still contemporary followed. By the late first millennium BC, the Agaws occupied the northern Ethiopian region, as the Sidamo occupied the central and southern parts of Ethiopia, making inaugural historical development of Ethiopia.

Afro-Asiatic languages were present in Africa and the Middle East by the eighth to sixth millennium BCE. This language family includes various modern and extinct African and Asian languages such as Oromo, Somali, Egyptian, Berber, Hausa, Hebrew, Arabic, Aramaic, and Akkadian. Ge'ez was developed around sixth century BCE and evident by inscriptions of contemporary kingdom of D'mt. The language dominance was eclipsed by 1000 AD, but the highland inhabitants used it as written scholar and liturgical language between 300s and 1800s.

Antiquity

In 980 BCE, Dʿmt was established in present-day Eritrea and the Tigray Region of Ethiopia, straddling South Arabia in present-day of Yemen. This polity's capital was located at Yeha, in what is now northern Ethiopia. Most modern historians consider this civilization to be a native Ethiopian one, although in earlier times many suggested it was Sabaean-influenced because of the latter's hegemony of the Red Sea.

Other scholars regard Dʿmt as the result of a union of Afroasiatic-speaking cultures of the Cushitic and Semitic branches; namely, local Agaw peoples and Sabaeans from Southern Arabia. However, Ge'ez, the ancient Semitic language of Ethiopia, is thought to have developed independently from the Sabaean language, one of the South Semitic languages. As early as 2000 BCE, other Semitic speakers were living in Ethiopia and Eritrea where Ge'ez developed. Sabaean influence is now thought to have been minor, limited to a few localities, and disappearing after a few decades or a century. It may have been a trading or military colony in alliance with the Ethiopian civilization of Dʿmt or some other proto-Axumite state. Politically integrated, the Kingdom of Aksum  was emerged independently from at least 100 BC, and its civilization grew from 1st century AD. The kingdom dominated the Red Sea, the Northeast Africa in the present location between northern Ethiopia (Tigray Region), eastern Sudan, Eritrea, South Arabia. It was by far powerful empire and trading nation between Roman Empire and India. The Aksumite lingua franca was Greek evolved from Hellenistic period in 330–305 BC and officially adopted in the first century. It was soon replaced by Ge'ez in the 4th century. Politically and culturally influenced partially with Byzantine Empire, the Aksumite achieved major historical grounds, Orthodox Tewahedo Christianity introduced and has been state religion in the early 4th century, construction of stone-fitted palace and public buildings, and erection of large obelisks around the capital Axum. These all are milestones that culminate in the rise of Ethiopian identity where the Greek exonym "Ethiopians" came to use by the kingdom under king Ezana's reign in the 4th century. The first century BCE  Greek historian Diodorus Siculus claimed the Ethiopian nativity as "true natives", "most pious and righteous" in his record. This assertion resonated by locality of declaring themselves a "Habesha people". His record expounded the nature of Ethiopians, including highly proselytizing to neighboring Egypt. He denoted these people locating in the place superimposed by Nubia and Meroë, connected to the Nile river, having distinct rainy season and wonderful lake.

Middle Ages

The kingdom enlarged its territory by the half of 4th century after conquering neighbor city Meroë in 330, and entered "Golden Age" for the next three centuries. Aksum's power began declining at time of Islamic Golden Age, where they frequently countered intrusions by Arab Muslims in the South Arabia protectorate (modern Yemen), making them to evicted more in the southern of Agaw population. 
In 10th century, the kingdom ultimately collapsed followed by pillage by Queen Gudit, after execution of Christians and ordered arson in church. While Aksum's existence extinguished, the follow-up kingdom of Zagwe likely of a continuation of its civilization and revival of Christianity, and a new multi-ethnic empire-state was formed in title of "king of kings".

The successful integration of Agaw and Semitic groups in the north prolonged over millennium and eventually forms Tigrayans and Amhara people. The Zagwe kingdom capital, relocated to Lalibela, and sparked a new cultural life. The most notable churches in this period was constructed with unique rock-hewn architecture. A dominant group, Amhara, continues to expand its territory in so-called Solomonic period after the downfall of Zagwe in 1270, and by the late 13th century, they reached to southern Shewa. Since then, centralized military unit was buildup while frequently engaged war with Sidama kingdom in the west and Muslim population to the east.

One of the most important era for Christian and Muslim insight, and the resultant of religious war was in the mid-16th century of Ethiopian–Adal War, involving the Amhara, Tigrayan and Agaw force allied to the Ethiopian Empire (Abyssinia) and the Muslim states composed mostly of Harari and Somali people, together forms the Adal Sultanate. The Oromo people additionally took an advantage of the war and occupied much the northern highland zone of the Amhara empire in the Oromo migrations.

Early modern period

The Oromo remained predominantly pastoral life who dominated the Amhara empire of Abyssinia for the rest of era. A blossom life continued throughout early modern period with the founding of capital Gondar in the early 18th century, by Emperor Fasilides, commencing a "Gondarine period". 

Between 1769 and 1855, Ethiopia experienced a period of isolation referred to as the Zemene Mesafint or "Age of Princes". The Emperors became figureheads, controlled by regional lords and noblemen like Ras Mikael Sehul of Tigray, Ras Wolde Selassie of Tigray, and by the Yejju Oromo dynasty of the Wara Sheh, such as Ras Gugsa of Yejju. Prior to the Zemene Mesafint, Emperor Iyoas I had introduced the Oromo language (Afaan Oromo) at court, instead of Amharic. In 1855, Emperor Tewodros II sought to establish permanent Ethiopian border by solidifying the Shewan kingdoms. Tewodros II is often credited with being the preliminary figure of modern Ethiopian history but his reign ended prematurely when he committed suicide during the British Expedition to Abyssinia. 

Emperor Menelik II done major reformations to the country by the late 1890s: under his reign, Menelik extensively conquered the rest of kingdoms nearby region, while annexing the Tigray Province, ultimately formed the modern border of Ethiopia. His reign brought sharp solidification of the current Ethiopian national identity. The Battle of Adwa was a 1896 colonial resistance battle between the Ethiopian Empire led by Menelik and Kingdom of Italy led by General Oreste Baratieri, involving respective 100,000 and 17,700 troops, where Ethiopian armies decisively defeated them and secured sovereignty. The battle became signature national pride among Ethiopians, and beyond for Pan-Africanism. The Treaty of Addis Ababa (1896) settled an end of Italo-Ethiopian War, and modern border of Ethiopia was created as a background of ceased foreign external pressure against the sovereignty of Ethiopia. Ethiopia, along with Liberia, became the only independent African survivors against the European colonization.

Current era

An Italian occupation of Ethiopia following Second Italo-Ethiopian War brought legacy of ethnic marginalization of major ethnic groups: the Oromos, Amharas, Tigrayans, and Somalis. Ethiopia underwent series civil clashes under communist military junta Derg. Ethnic nationalism and similar policies implemented by  the Ethiopian Peoples' Revolutionary Democratic Front (EPRDF), which brought Ethiopia to ethnic federalist state since 1995, which was aimed to reduce internal ethnic conflicts and grant freedom of choice within every ethnic groups although, Ethiopia then faced more prolong internal conflicts and ethnic clashes in the 21st-century.

Ethnicity

Major ethnic groups
 Oromo 34.4% 
 Amhara 27.0%
 Somali 6.2%
 Tigray 6.1%
 Sidama 4.0%
 Gurage 2.5%
 Welayta 2.3%
 Hadiya 1.7%
 Afar 1.7% 
 Gamo 1.5% 
 Other ethnic groups 12.6%

List

Ethiopian diaspora 

 Ethiopian Americans
 Ethiopian Australians
 Ethiopian Canadians
 Ethiopian Jews in Israel
 Ethiopians in Italy
 Ethiopians in the United Kingdom
 Ethiopians in Denmark
 Ethiopians in Norway
 Ethiopians in Sweden
Eritreans
 Habesha peoples
 Eritrean people of Ethiopian descent
 Ethiopian people of Eritrean descent

Languages

Until the fall of the Derg, Amharic served as the sole official language in government administration, courts, church and even in primary school instruction; although in the 17th century during the Zemene Mesafint under the rule of the Warasek dynasty, the Oromo language did serve as the official language of the  Ethiopian Empire's royal court. After 1991, Amharic has been replaced in many areas by other official government languages such as Oromo, Somali and Tigrinya. English is the most widely spoken foreign language and is taught in all secondary schools.

According to the 2007 Ethiopian census and the CIA World Fact Book, the largest first languages are: Oromo 24,929,567 speakers or 33.8% of the total population; Amharic 21,631,370 or 29.3% (federal working language); Somali 4,609,274 or 6.2%; Tigrinya 4,324,476 or 5.9%; Sidamo 4,981,471 or 4%; Wolaytta 1,627,784 or 2.2%; Gurage 1,481,783 or 2%; and Afar 1,281,278 or 1.7%. Widely-spoken foreign languages include Arabic, English (major foreign language taught in schools), and Italian (spoken by an Italian minority).

Religion
According to the CIA Factbook the religious demography of Ethiopia is as follows; Ethiopian Orthodox 43.8%, Muslim 31.3%, Protestant 22.8%, Catholic 0.7%, traditional 0.6%, and other 0.8%.

Diaspora

The largest diaspora community is found in the United States. According to the U.S. Census Bureau, 250,000 Ethiopian immigrants lived in the United States as of 2008. An additional 30,000 U.S.-born citizens reported Ethiopian ancestry. According to Aaron Matteo Terrazas, "if the descendants of Ethiopian-born migrants (the second generation and up) are included, the estimates range upwards of 460,000 in the United States (of which approximately 350,000 are in the Washington, DC Metropolitan Area; 96,000 in Los Angeles; and 10,000 in New York)."

A large Ethiopian community is also found in Israel, where Ethiopians make up almost 1.9% of the population. Almost the entire community are members of the Beta Israel community. There are also large number of Ethiopian emigrants in Saudi Arabia, Italy, Lebanon, United Kingdom, Canada, Sweden and Australia..

Genetic studies

Autosomal DNA

Studies conducted on Ethiopians belonging to Semitic and Cushitic ethnic groups mostly from the north of the country (Oromo, Amhara, Tigray, and Gurage), estimate approximately 40% of their autosomal ancestry to be derived from an ancient non-African back-migration from the Near East, and about 60% to be of native African origin (from a population indigenous or "autochthonous" to the Horn of Africa). Hodgson et al. (2014) found a distinct African ancestral component in Afro-Asiatic populations in the Horn (dubbed "Ethiopic"), as well as a distinct non-African component (dubbed "Ethio-Somali"). The data also revealed Nilo-Saharan ancestry in Afro-Asiatic populations and "Ethiopic" ancestry in Nilo-Saharan populations, suggesting an intricate history of contact in the region. Ethiopian Nilo-Saharan groups and the endogamous Aari blacksmith caste were found to have little to no Eurasian admixture. Aari blacksmiths may descend from "Ethiopic" hunter-gatherers who were assimilated as farmers expanded in the region or a subset of a single population recently marginalized for their occupation. According to Hollfelder et al. (2017), "Northeast African Nilotes showed some distinction from an ancient Ethiopian individual (Mota, found in the Mota Cave in the southern Ethiopian highlands), which suggests population structure between northeast and eastern Africa already 4,500 years ago. The modern-day Nilotic groups are likely direct descendants of past populations living in northeast Africa many thousands of years ago." Pickrell et al. (2014) found that West Eurasian ancestry peaks in the Amhara and Tigrayans at 49% and 50%, respectively. In Pagani, Luca et al. (2012), this non-African component, is estimated to have entered the Horn of Africa roughly ~3,000 years ago and was found to be similar to the populations in the Levant. The paper goes on to say that this coincides with the introduction of Ethio-Semitic languages into the region. Gallego Llorente, M et al. (2015) discovered extensive admixture in Eastern Africa from a population closely related to early Neolithic farmers from the Near-East/Anatolia. López, Saioa et al. (2021) found that when comparing Ethiopians to external populations only, Nilo-Saharan speakers (as well as the Chabu, Dassanech, and Karo) in the southwest shared more recent ancestry with Bantu and Nilotic speakers, while Afro-Asiatic speakers in the northeast shared more recent ancestry with Egyptians and West Eurasians. The study revealed that groups belonging to the Cushitic, Omotic, and Semitic branches of Afro-Asiatic show high genetic similarity to each other on average.

Tishkoff et al. (2009) identified fourteen ancestral population clusters which correlate with self-described ethnicity and shared cultural and/or linguistic properties in Africa in what was the largest autosomal study of the continent to date. The Burji, Konso and Beta Israel were sampled from Ethiopia. The Afroasiatic speaking Ethiopians sampled were cumulatively (Fig.5B) found to belong to: 71% in the "Cushitic" cluster, 6% in the "Saharan/Dogon" cluster, 5% in the "Niger Kordofanian" cluster, 3% each in the "Nilo-Saharan" and "Chadic Saharan" cluster, while the balance (12%) of their assignment was distributed among the remnant (9) Associated Ancestral Clusters (AAC's) found in Sub-Saharan Africa. The "Cushitic" cluster was also deemed "closest to the non-African AACs, consistent with an East African migration of modern humans out of Africa or a back-migration of non-Africans into Saharan and Eastern Africa."

Wilson et al. (2001), an autosomal DNA study based on cluster analysis that looked at a combined sample of Amhara and Oromo examining a single enzyme variant: drug metabolizing enzyme (DME) loci, found that 62% of Ethiopians fall into the same cluster of Ashkenazi Jews, Norwegians and Armenians based on that gene. Only 24% of Ethiopians cluster with Bantus and Afro-Caribbeans, 8% with Papua New Guineans, and 6% with Chinese.

Paternal lineages

A composite look at most YDNA studies done so far
reveals that, out of a total of 459 males sampled from Ethiopia, approximately 58% of Y-chromosome haplotypes were found to belong to Haplogroup E, of which 71% (41% of total) were characterized by one of its further downstream sub lineage known as E1b1b, while the remainder were mostly characterized by Haplogroup E1b1(x E1b1b,E1b1a), and to a lesser extent Haplogroup E2. With respect to E1b1b, some studies have found that it exists at its highest level among the Oromo, where it represented 62.8% of the haplotypes, while it was found at 35.4% among the Amhara, other studies however have found an almost equal representation of Haplogroup E1b1b at approximately 57% in both the Oromo and the Amhara. The haplogroup (as its predecessor E1b1) is thought to have originated in Ethiopia or elsewhere in the Horn of Africa. About one half of E1b1b found in Ethiopia is further characterized by E1b1b1a (M78), which arose later in north-eastern Africa and then back-migrated to eastern Africa.

Haplogroup J has been found at a frequency of approximately 18% in Ethiopians, with a higher prevalence among the Amhara, where it has been found to exist at levels as high as 35%, of which about 94% (17% of total) is of the type J1, while 6% (1% of total) is of J2 type. On the other hand, 26% of the individuals sampled in the Arsi control portion of Moran et al. (2004) were found to belong to Haplogroup J.

Another fairly prevalent lineage in Ethiopia belongs to Haplogroup A, occurring at a frequency of about 17% within Ethiopia, it is almost all characterized by its downstream sub lineage of A3b2 (M13). Restricted to Africa, and mostly found along the Rift Valley from Ethiopia to Cape Town, Haplogroup A represents the deepest branch in the Human Y- Chromosome phylogeny.

Finally, Haplogroup T at approximately 4% and Haplogroup B at approximately 3%, make up the remainder of the Y-DNA Haplogroups found within Ethiopia.

Maternal lineages

The maternal ancestry of Ethiopians is similarly diverse. About half (52.2%) of Ethiopians belongs to mtdna Haplogroups L0, L1, L2, L3, L4, L5, or L6. These haplogroups are generally confined to the African continent. They also originated either in Ethiopia or very near. The other portion of the population belong to Haplogroup N (31%) and Haplogroup M1 (17%). There is controversy surrounding their origins as either native or a possible ancient back migration into Ethiopia from Asia.

Passarino et al. (1998) suggested that: Caucasoid gene flow into the Ethiopian gene pool occurred predominantly through males. Conversely, the Niger–Congo contribution to the Ethiopian population occurred mainly through females. While there is debate among the scientific community of what exactly constitutes "Caucasoid gene flow", the same study further stated: Indeed, Ethiopians do not seem to result only from a simple combination of proto-Niger–Congo and Middle Eastern genes. Their African component cannot be completely explained by that of present-day Niger–Congo speakers, and it is quite different from that of the Khoisan. Thus, a portion of the current Ethiopian gene pool may be the product of in situ differentiation from an ancestral gene pool."

Scott et al. (2005) similarly observed that the Ethiopian population is almost equally divided between individuals that carry Eurasian maternal lineages, and those that belong to African clades. They describe the presence of Eurasian clades in the country as sequences that "are thought to be found in high numbers in Ethiopia either as a result of substantial gene flow into Ethiopia from Eurasia (Chen et al., 2000; Richards et al., 2003), or as a result of having undergone several branching events in demic diffusion, acting as founder lineages for non-African populations". The researchers further found no association between regional origin of subjects or language family (Semitic/Cushitic) and their mitochondrial type:  The haplogroup distribution amongst all subjects (athletes and controls) from different geographical regions of Ethiopia is displayed in Table 3. As can be seen graphically in Fig. 3, the mtDNA haplogroup distribution of each region is similar, with all regions displaying similar proportions of African 'L' haplogroups (Addis Ababa: 59%, Arsi: 50%, Shewa: 44%, Other: 57%). No association was found between regional origin of subjects and their mitochondrial type (v2=8.5, 15 df, P=0.9). Similarly, the mtDNA haplogroup distribution of subjects (athletes and controls) speaking languages from each family is shown in Table 3. Again there was no association between language family and mitochondrial type (v2=5.4, 5 df, P=0.37). As can be seen in Fig. 4, the haplogroup distributions of each language family are again very similar.

In addition, Musilová et al. (2011) observed significant maternal ties between its Ethiopian and other Horn African samples with its Western Asian samples; particularly in terms of the HV1b mtDNA haplogroup. The authors noted:
"Detailed phylogeography of HV1 sequences shows that more recent demographic upheavals likely contributed to their spread from West Arabia to East Africa, a finding concordant with archaeological records suggesting intensive maritime trade in the Red Sea from the sixth millennium BC onwards."

According to Černý et al. (2008), many Ethiopians also share specific maternal lineages with areas in Yemen and other parts of Northeast Africa. The authors indicate that:
"The most frequent haplotype in west coastal Yemen is 16126–16362, which is found not only in the Ethiopian highlands but also in Somalia, lower Egypt and at especially high frequency in the Nubians. The Tihama share some West Eurasian haplotypes with Africans, e.g. J and K with Ethiopians, Somali and Egyptians."

See also
Ethnic groups in Ethiopia
Government of Ethiopia
Regions of Ethiopia

Footnotes

References
. Total count of persons: 19,855,288.
 E. Sylvia Pankhurst, The Ethiopian People. Their Rights and Progress. Woodford Green, Essex: New Times & Ethiopia News 1946.
 Edward Ullendorff, The Ethiopians: an introduction to country and people. London: Oxford University Press 1960, ²1965, ³1973, ⁴1990 (Wiesbaden: F. Steiner).

External links
 Directory of ethnic groups with information on population numbers and religion, maintained by Protestant churches and mission agencies

Society of Ethiopia